Na Kaeo is a tambon (subdistrict) of Ko Kha District, in Lampang Province, Thailand. As of 2010, it has a total population of 9,690 people.

Administration
The tambon contains 9  administrative villages (Muban), the latest created in 2004.

In 1996, the Tambon administrative organization (TAO) Na Kaeo was established as the local administration for the subdistrict. In 2008, this was upgraded to a subdistrict municipality (thesaban tambon).

References

External links
ThaiTambon on Na Kaeo
http://www.nakaew.go.th/ Website of Na Kaeo subdistrict municipality

Tambon of Lampang province
Populated places in Lampang province